Yanick Dubé (born June 14, 1974) is a Canadian former professional ice hockey player. During the 1993–94 season while playing with the Laval Titan of the Quebec Major Junior Hockey League (QMJHL), Dube scored 66 goals and 141 points in 64 games to lead the QMJHL in both goals and points. Dube was named to the QMJHL First All-Star Team, and was selected at the Canadian Hockey League's Sportsman of the Year. He was selected by the Vancouver Canucks in the 6th round (117th overall) of the 1994 NHL Entry Draft.

Dube began his playing career in Canada with the Laval Titan in the QMJHL. After a few years in the American Hockey League, Dube moved in 1997 to Switzerland. Subsequently, he moved first to Germany with EC Bad Tolz, and later back to Switzerland. In 2005, Dube went again back to Germany, and took on German nationality. Until 2009 he played with Bad Tolz, where he was considered a fan favourite. Dube signed for the 2009-10 season a contract with the Wolves Freiburg, and in September 2010, Dube signed again with EC Bad Tolz.

International
At the 1994 World Junior Ice Hockey Championships, Dube tied for the team scoring lead with 10 points to win the gold medal with Team Canada. He went on to play 24 games with the Canada men's national ice hockey team during the 1994–95 season, including competing at the 1994 Deutschland Cup.

Awards and honours

Career statistics

Regular season and playoffs

International

References

External links

Living people
1974 births
Augsburger Panther players
Canadian ice hockey centres
Cornwall Aces players
EC Bad Tölz players
EHC Freiburg players
EHC Olten players
Essen Mosquitoes players
HC Fribourg-Gottéron players
HC La Chaux-de-Fonds players
HC Sierre players
Laval Titan Collège Français players
Laval Titan players
Prince Edward Island Senators players
Syracuse Crunch players
Vancouver Canucks draft picks
Canadian expatriate ice hockey players in Germany
Canadian expatriate ice hockey players in Switzerland